Pseudidmonea is a genus of bryozoans belonging to the monotypic family Pseudidmoneidae.

The species of this genus are found in Southern Hemisphere.

Species:

Pseudidmonea fissurata 
Pseudidmonea gracilis 
Pseudidmonea johnsoni

References

Cyclostomatida
Bryozoan genera